Zhonghe Road Station ( is an elevated metro station in Ningbo, Zhejiang, China. Zhonghe Road Station situates in Xinqi Subdistrict near Taishan Road. Construction of the station starts in December 2012 and started service on March 19, 2016.

Exits 

Zhonghe Road Station has two exits.

References 

Railway stations in Zhejiang
Railway stations in China opened in 2016
Ningbo Rail Transit stations